John Manchester Allen (3 August 1901 – 28 November 1941) was a New Zealand politician of the National Party. He also served in the Second World War and commanded the 21st Battalion from May 1941 until he was killed in action in Libya.

Biography

Allen was born in Cheadle, Staffordshire, England, in 1901. His father, John Candlish Allen, died in France in 1917 from wounds received in the First World War. His uncles were Stephen Allen and William Allen, and his grandfather was William Shepherd Allen. He was educated at King's College, Auckland, and at Pembroke College, Cambridge where he graduated with MA and LLB degrees. He was a farmer in Morrinsville, and an Anglican lay reader.

Following the outbreak of the Second World War, he volunteered to serve with the 2nd New Zealand Expeditionary Force and was posted to 18th Battalion as its second-in-command. He was in Crete as commander of the 21st Battalion before being killed in action during an offensive in Libya. He was succeeded in the Hauraki electorate by Andy Sutherland, who won the resulting .

Notes

References

1901 births
1941 deaths
Alumni of Pembroke College, Cambridge
English emigrants to New Zealand
New Zealand Anglicans
New Zealand farmers
New Zealand National Party MPs
New Zealand military personnel killed in World War II
New Zealand people of World War II
People educated at King's College, Auckland
People from Morrinsville
Members of the New Zealand House of Representatives
New Zealand MPs for North Island electorates
People from Cheadle, Staffordshire
20th-century New Zealand politicians
Anglican lay readers
Military personnel from Staffordshire